Matheo Henrique Zoch Mèndez (born 12 July 1996) is a Bolivian footballer who plays in Bolivian Primera División for Wilstermann.

He came through the ranks at Oriente Petrolero before moving to Chilean club C.D. Huachipato in 2017 and after short spells with Club Deportivo Guabirá and Royal Pari F.C. he returned to Oriente Petrolero for the 2020 season. He signed for The Strongest on 16 January 2021.

He made his full debut for Bolivia on the 10 November 2016
against Venezuela.

References

External links
 

Living people
Bolivian footballers
Bolivia international footballers
Association football midfielders
Oriente Petrolero players
C.D. Huachipato footballers
Guabirá players
Royal Pari F.C. players
Bolivian Primera División players
Chilean Primera División players
Bolivian expatriate footballers
Bolivian expatriate sportspeople in Chile
Expatriate footballers in Chile
Bolivian people of German descent
1996 births